Morten Fevang (born 6 March 1975) is a retired Norwegian professional football player.

Club career
He came to OB from Odd Grenland, and on 28 May 2007 he announced a move home to Odd at the beginning of the summer transfer window.

International career
On 25 May 2009, he was selected by Egil "Drillo" Olsen to be a part of the Norwegian national team for the first time, at the age of 34. He made his debut in a 0–2 loss away to Netherlands in a world cup qualifier. This became his only appearance for the national team.

Career statistics

References

External links

 OB profile 
  
 

1975 births
Living people
People from Vestfold
People from Sandefjord
Norwegian footballers
Norway international footballers
IL Runar footballers
Odds BK players
Odense Boldklub players
Eliteserien players
Norwegian First Division players
Danish Superliga players
Norwegian expatriate footballers
Expatriate men's footballers in Denmark
Norwegian expatriate sportspeople in Denmark
Association football midfielders
Sportspeople from Vestfold og Telemark